Wanquanheqiao station is a station on Line 16 of the Beijing Subway.

History

Planning 
In 2011, the original plan for line 16 was to go past Changchunyuan Park then turn south, going along Summer Palace Road after passing Haidian stadium, then going past Suzhoujie station. The station was originally called Haidianqiao station. However, the planned line went near Peking University, which had vibration issues with its precision instruments when Line 4 was built east of the campus. In 2011, the precision instruments was already affected by a smaller area reconstruction's vibration, and because Line 16 would only be 200 meters away from Peking University, the precision instruments would be severely affected by the line, and scientific work would be severely disrupted. Because of this, the Beijing Municipal Planning Commission studied the vibrational impact of the campus precision instruments, and NPC deputies submitted a proposal in 2012.

On August 5, 2013, the Beijing Municipal Planning Commission announced a proposal for rerouting Line 16 between Xiyuan and Suzhoujie stations. The line was to turn south, going under Haidian Township, then turning east at Haidian Park, going under Wanquanhe bridge, then turning south at Suzhou Rd. The station will be under Wanquanhe bridge. Previous studies has shown that the line cannot meet Peking University's vibration and noise reduction measures. In December 2013, the final plan was released, which included Wanquanheqiao station.

Construction 
Construction of this station started on September 6, 2014. The station was connected to Xiyuan station in March 2017. The station opened on 31 December 2020.

Station Layout 
The station has an underground island platform. There are 3 exits, lettered A, B and C. Exit A is accessible via an elevator.

References 

Beijing Subway stations in Haidian District